"Dead on Arrival" is the debut single by American rock band Fall Out Boy and the first single (second single in the UK) of their first full-length album, Take This to Your Grave (2003). It was released on blue 7" vinyl by Fueled by Ramen. The song is among the band's earliest compositions, and was regularly played in concert until 2013.

"Dead on Arrival" was also included on a Kerrang! compilation CD. It is the first track on Fall Out Boy's first greatest hits album, Believers Never Die – Greatest Hits (2009). The song is playable in the game Rock Band.

Lyrics
The band wrote three songs, including "Dead on Arrival", intended for release on a split album with 504 Plan, but the release fell through and the songs were included on Take This to Your Grave instead. While the bass guitarist Pete Wentz became the band's primary lyricist, the frontman Patrick Stump wrote the lyrics for "Dead on Arrival". Stump, who then viewed himself as an "artsy fartsy dude who didn't want to be in a pop-punk band", had composed much of the band's lyrics for the first songs of Take This To Your Grave, as he recalled in a ten-year album anniversary interview for Take This to Your Grave with Alternative Press.

Music video
The music video was made up from various clips of the band performing live and travelling around the U.S. to small venue shows. The band said that the video was supposed to show that they were homesick. Jack Marin (the former bass guitarist with Cute Is What We Aim For) can be seen for a short period of time in the crowd. The police in the video were The Arlington Heights Police Department and had the show shut down, but Fall Out Boy apologized to them, and thanked them for being in their video. One of the venues in the video is the Knights of Columbus Hall in Arlington Heights where the band regularly played to a small local audience in their early days.

References 

2003 debut singles
2003 songs
Fall Out Boy songs
Songs written by Patrick Stump
Songs written by Pete Wentz